The American Association for Men in Nursing (AAMN) is a professional organization for nurses that works to improve gender inclusion in nursing profession. The AAMN runs an annual award scheme which aims to recognize contributions made to the profession.

History
AAMN was established in 1971 by Steve Miller, a nurse, set up a group of like-minded men in Michigan.

The group claims to have 23,000 members across the USA.

Stated aims
The AAMN aims to encourage and support men in nursing.

References

External links
 AAMN website

Nursing organizations in the United States
Medical and health organizations based in Kentucky
Men in nursing